Mark James Walter Cameron CBE (17 June 1911 – 26 January 1985) was a British journalist, in whose memory the annual James Cameron Memorial Lecture is given.

Early life 
Cameron was born in Battersea, London, of Scottish parentage. His father, William Ernest Cameron, was a barrister who wrote novels under the pseudonym Mark Allerton and his mother was Margaret Douglas (née Robertson) Cameron.

Career 
Cameron began as an office dogsbody with the Weekly News in 1935. Having worked for several Scottish newspapers and for the Daily Express in Fleet Street, he was rejected for military service in World War II. After the war, his experience of reporting on the Bikini Atoll nuclear experiments and the first British nuclear test in South Australia turned him into a pacifist and, later, a founding member of the Campaign for Nuclear Disarmament. He continued to work for the Express until 1950, after which he briefly joined Picture Post, where he and photographer Bert Hardy covered the Korean War, winning the Missouri Pictures of the Year International Award for "Inchon". Tom Hopkinson, the editor of Picture Post, lost his job as publisher when he defended the magazine's coverage of atrocities committed by South Korean troops at a concentration camp in Pusan. Cameron wrote, "I had seen Belsen, but this was worse. This terrible mob of men – convicted of nothing, un-tried, South Koreans in South Korea, suspected of being 'unreliable'." The founder of the Hulton press, Edward G. Hulton, decided to "kill" the story.

In 1952 Cameron wrote an obituary essay for The Illustrated London News, "The King Is Dead", about the death of King George VI. Cameron then spent eight years with the News Chronicle until the paper ceased publication, in 1960. In 1953 he visited Albert Schweitzer in Lambaréné, in French Equatorial Africa (now Gabon) and found flaws in the practices and attitudes of Schweitzer and his staff. This was the subject of The Walrus and the Terrier, a BBC Radio 4 Afternoon Play by Christopher Ralling, broadcast on 7 April 2008.

In 1965, Cameron wangled his way into North Vietnam for interviews and photos (with photographer Romano Cagnoni) of Ho Chi Minh and its other leaders. His book Here Is Your Enemy was published in the United States, and his five-part series on North Vietnam was published in December 1965 in The New York Times, where it was edited by journalist Anthony Lewis.

Cameron also did illustration work, especially in his early career. Working in Scotland for D. C. Thomson, he prepared drawings for sensationalist items in Thomson's publications. He rebelled when asked to draw a picture of a murdered young girl, embellishing it with excess blood and grisly detail. Called to Thomson's office, he was rebuked merely for exposing her underwear.

Cameron became a broadcaster for the BBC after the war, writing and presenting such television series as Cameron Country, and numerous single documentaries. An unusual example was Edgar Wallace: The Man Who Made His Name, a television biography of the thriller writer and journalist. He was a frequent contributor to Up Sunday, a magazine show that featured him and other commentators talking to the camera about topics of interest to them. Cameron also wrote a radio play, The Pump (1973), based on his experience of open heart surgery, which won a Prix Italia award in 1973. In his last years, he wrote a column for The Guardian. Cameron wrote two volumes of autobiography: Point of Departure, a chronicle of his life, and An Indian Summer, about his relationship with India, his marriage to his third wife, Moni, originally of Indian nationality, and his serious car accident and near death in Calcutta.

Personal life
Cameron's first wife, Elma, died in childbirth near the start of World War II. Before she died she gave birth to their daughter, also Elma (Eleanor Margaret). 
He later married Elizabeth Marris (who already had a son, Desmond Roderic O’Conor, by a previous marriage to Denis O'Conor Don). He also had a son, Fergus, with Elizabeth. 
In 1971 he married Moneesha ("Moni") Sarkar. 
James Cameron died of a stroke in his sleep on 26 January 1985. He was 73.

Among his literary relatives are the Gighan poet the Rev Kenneth Macleod – of "The Road to the Isles" fame – and the writer the Rev Dr John Urquhart Cameron of St Andrews.

Works by Cameron

Books
 Touch of the Sun (1950)
 Mandarin Red (1955)
 1914: A Portrait of the Year (1959)
 The African Revolution (1961)
 1916: Year of Decision (1962)
 Men of Our Time (1963)
 Here is Your Enemy (1965)
 Witness [in Vietnam] (1966)
 Point of Departure (1967) 
 What a Way to Run the Tribe (selected journalism) (1968)
 An Indian Summer: A Personal Experience of India (1974) 
 The Making of Israel (1976) 
 Wish You Were Here: The English at Play. London: Gordon Fraser, 1976. . Introduction and commentary by Cameron, photographs by Patrick Ward).
 Yesterday's Witness (1979)
 The Best of Cameron (1981)

Broadcasts
Cameron's television work includes:

James Cameron Memorial Trust Award 
There is an annual James Cameron Award Ceremony in London.

Previous winners include:

 1987. David Hirst
 1988. Michael Buerk
 1989. Neal Ascherson
 1990. John Simpson
 1991. Robert Fisk & Charles Wheeler
 1992. Bridget Kendall
 1993. Martin Woollacott
 1994. Ed Vulliamy
 1995. George Alagiah
 1996. Maggie O'Kane
 1997. Fergal Keane
 1998. Jonathan Steele
 1999. Ann Leslie
 2000. Jon Swain
 2001. For consistently impartial reporting from Israel, Suzanne Goldenberg.
 2002. For reporting from Africa, Chris McGreal.
 2003. Norma Percy
 2004. For Outstanding Journalism, John Ware.
 2004. Special Posthumous Award, Paul Foot.
 2005. Lindsey Hilsum
 2006. Patrick Cockburn
 2007. Ghaith Abdul-Ahad
 2008. Peter Taylor
 2009. For reporting on Barack Obama's election, Gary Younge.
 2010. Michela Wrong & Lasantha Wickrematunge
 2011. Alex Crawford
 2012. Martin Wolf
 2013. Lyse Doucet
 2014. Luke Harding
 2015. Jeremy Bowen
 2016. Ian Pannell received the James Cameron Memorial Award. The Special Award went to David Walsh of The Sunday Times. The lecture was given by Gideon Rachman of The Financial Times.

From 2017 onwards, City, University of London continued to host the James Cameron Memorial Lecture, but the prize was replaced with the Eric Robbins Prize. The James Cameron Memorial Lecture was given by:
 2017. Lyse Doucet
2018. Lionel Barber
2019. Isabel Hilton

References

External links 

 James Cameron Memorial Lecture and Award at City University London
 
 James Cameron at BFI
 In the Beginning was the Word, BBC TV, 1984 – first episode in Once Upon a Time series about Cameron
 Point of Departure, Cameron Country episode (clip), BBC TV, 14 September 1968
 James Cameron: A Pain In The Neck, BBC Time Shift Documentary
 James Cameron (short biography with excerpts from his writing), spartacus-educational.com
 Meeting Two British Journalists Who Made History by David J. Marcou. Great History Blog, 2009 (archived 2013)
 Another Famous James Cameron by David J. Marcou, 2009, La Crosse History Unbound
James Cameron's World (1911–1985): A Great Journalist Lives His Calling Via the Curiosity and Talents of a Cat by David Joseph Marcou as cited in La Crosse Public Library Catalog

1911 births
1985 deaths
British autobiographers
Scottish journalists
British male journalists
British reporters and correspondents
British television presenters
Commanders of the Order of the British Empire
Prix Italia winners